A Pastoriza is a municipality in the Spanish province of Lugo. It has a population of 3,911 (Spanish 2003 Census) and an area of 175 km². It belongs to the Terra Chá region. In this county the most important river in Galicia begins and one of the most plentiful in Spain, the Minho River.

Parishes
 A Aguarda (San Martiño)
 Álvare (Santa María)
 Baltar (San Pedro Fiz)
 Bretoña (Santa María)
 Cadavedo (San Bartolomeu)

Monuments
The artistic heritage of A Pastoriza is noted for its many stone crosses, chapels and churches that make up the rural municipality. The Temple of Breton is considered the cradle of the diocese of Mondoñedo-Ferrol because it was the ancient Britoniensis episcopal until the eighth century. Several authors defend the existence of a British Christian society in this area. It is believed that it was they who founded a Breton bishopric, Britonia. 
 

Municipalities in the Province of Lugo